Sergei Solomatov (born August 22, 1973) is a Soviet and Russian former professional ice hockey forward. He is a one-time Russian and Danish Champion.  After completing his career as a player, he became a coach.

Awards and honors

References

External links
Biographical information and career statistics from Eliteprospects.com, or The Internet Hockey Database

1973 births
Living people
Chelmet Chelyabinsk players
Metallurg Magnitogorsk players
Traktor Chelyabinsk players
Ak Bars Kazan players
Rødovre Mighty Bulls players
Amur Khabarovsk players
HC Spartak Moscow players
HC Sibir Novosibirsk players
Russian ice hockey forwards